11/5 was an American hip hop group from the Hunters Point section of San Francisco, California whose members were Maine-O, Hennessy and Taydatay, they were signed to Dogday Records, and were active from 1994 to 2001.

Biography
The Bay Area-based trio first appeared in 1994 on Primo's album Stickin' to the Script on the song "Killa". Shortly after, they would release their debut album, Fiendin' 4 tha Funk. The album sold little outside the Bay Area and only made it to #76 on the Billboard's Top R&B/Hip-Hop Albums chart. The following year, they released a follow-up entitled A-1 Yola, which would fare much better on the charts, making it to #33 on the Top R&B/Hip-Hop Albums chart and #22 on the Top Heatseekers. After A-1 Yola, two more albums were released, 1999's The Overdose and 2001's After the Drama, as well as two compilations, before disbanding in 2001.

Discography

Studio albums
Fiendin' 4 tha Funk (1995)
A-1 Yola (1996)
The Overdose (1999)
After the Drama (2001)

Collaboration albums
U Didn't Know?? with Cold World Hustlers, U.D.I. & Big Mack (2002)

Compilation albums
Bootlegs & G-Sides (1997)
Bootlegs & G-Sides, Vol. 2 (2000)
Grind & Post (2002)

Solo projects
Taydatay – Anticipaytion (1998)
Taydatay Presents – Bay 2 Sac (2001)
Taydatay & Black C – Prime Factorz (2002)
Taydatay – Out of Sight, On the Grind (2003)
Taydatay Presents – Urban Legendz (2003)
Taydatay Aka T-Gunna – Death of a Legend • New Life for a Boss (2008)
Taydatay & Big Mack – Access Granted (2013)

Musical groups from San Francisco
Hip hop groups from California
Musical groups established in 1994
Musical groups disestablished in 2001
1994 establishments in California
Gangsta rap groups
Bloods
Bayview–Hunters Point, San Francisco